Euxinella may refer to:
 Euxinella (gastropod), a genus of gastropods in the family Clausiliidae
 Euxinella, a genus of protists in the family Loeblichiidae, synonym of Euxinita
 Euxinella, a genus of arachnids in the family arachnids, synonym of Nurscia